Leeward Community College is a public community college in Pearl City, Hawaii. It is one of 10 campuses of the University of Hawaii system and is accredited by the Accrediting Commission for Community and Junior Colleges.  Leeward's open admissions policy, only requires that a student be 18 years or older or earned a U.S. high school diploma or a GED (General Education Development) certificate.

The campus boasts the sculptures Among the Ruins by Satoru Abe (born 1926) and The Cat by Eli Marozzi (1913–1999).

Academics

Leeward Community College offers more than 50 degree and certificate programs ranging from career training to liberal arts. Free tutoring, at Leeward CC's Learning Resource Center, and job placement assistance are focused on helping students reach their educational goals.

Of Leeward students, 64% are majoring in Liberal Arts, pursuing a two-year associate degree, or preparing to transfer to a four-year institution. 29% are Career and Technical Education students, pursuing degrees or certificates in preparation for immediate employment.

In addition to a comprehensive liberal arts offering, Leeward offers programs in accounting, business, automotive technology, e-commerce, education, management, culinary arts, digital media, human services, information and computer science and television production.

Notable alumni
 Jennifer Carroll, 18th Lieutenant Governor of Florida
 Reggie Cross, professional basketball player

References

External links

 Official website

Community colleges in Hawaii
University of Hawaiʻi
Educational institutions established in 1968
Schools accredited by the Western Association of Schools and Colleges
1968 establishments in Hawaii
Pearl City, Hawaii